Pernarec is a municipality and village in Plzeň-North District in the Plzeň Region of the Czech Republic. It has about 700 inhabitants.

Administrative parts
Villages of Březí, Krukanice, Málkovice, Něšov and Skupeč are administrative parts of Pernarec.

Notable people
Wenzel Gruber (1814–1890), Austrian anatomist

References

Villages in Plzeň-North District